Employment discrimination on the basis of sexual orientation or gender identity is prohibited in the United States as per the United States Supreme Court ruling in Bostock v. Clayton County on June 15, 2020. A number of cities and counties in the United States have implemented non-discrimination laws for sexual orientation and/or gender identity. As of October 25, 2017, at least 400 cities and counties prohibit discrimination on the basis of sexual orientation and gender identity for both public and private employees. Most but not all of these cities and counties are located in states that have a statewide non-discrimination law for sexual orientation and/or gender identity.

Localities in bold are jurisdictions that prohibit discrimination in the public and private sector. Localities in italics are jurisdictions that prohibit discrimination in public employment only.

Additionally, the US Supreme Courth held in Bostock v. Clayton County and R.G. & G.R. Harris Funeral Homes Inc. v. Equal Employment Opportunity Commission that sexual orientation and gender identity are included under "sex" of Title VII of the Civil Rights Act of 1964. This affirms rulings in the Second, the Sixth, the Seventh, and the Eleventh circuit courts. Sexual orientation has been established as a protected class in Indiana and, similarly, gender identity in Alabama, Florida, Georgia, Kentucky, Michigan, Ohio and Tennessee, requiring heightened scrutiny in discrimination disputes. None of these states has enacted specific legislation addressing discrimination on account of sexual orientation and gender identity.

Circuit Court of Appeals rulings

Sexual orientation

Hively v. Ivy Tech Community College
In 2013, Kim Hively filed a lawsuit against the Ivy Tech Community College of Indiana in South Bend, arguing that she was denied promotions and let go from her job because of her sexual orientation. The United States Court of Appeals for the Seventh Circuit heard oral arguments in the case in November 2016 with discussion focusing on the meaning of the word "sex" in Title VII of the Civil Rights Act, which bans workplace discrimination based on race, religion, national origin or sex. On April 4, 2017, the Court of Appeals ruled in an 8–3 vote that the Civil Rights Act of 1964 prohibits employment discrimination on the basis of sexual orientation. Ivy Tech subsequently stated they would not appeal the ruling to the Supreme Court. This ruling creates a precedent for lower courts in Illinois, Indiana and Wisconsin to follow, meaning employment discrimination based on sexual orientation is now banned in these states (Illinois and Wisconsin already had laws prohibiting such discrimination). Human Rights Campaign hailed the ruling, saying: "Today's ruling is a monumental victory for fairness in the workplace, and for the dignity of lesbian, gay and bisexual Americans who may live in fear of losing their job based on whom they love."

Zarda v. Altitude Express, Inc.
On February 26, 2018, the United States Court of Appeals for the Second Circuit (covering Connecticut, New York and Vermont) ruled that Title VII of the Civil Rights Act of 1964 prohibits sexual orientation employment discrimination under the category of sex. Donald Zarda, who worked for Altitude Express as a skydiving instructor in New York, is gay. To avoid any discomfort his female students might feel being strapped to an unfamiliar man, Zarda would often disclose he was gay. Before one particular jump with a female student, Zarda told her that he was gay. After the skydive, the student told her boyfriend that Zarda had inappropriately touched her and disclosed his sexual orientation to excuse his behavior. The woman's boyfriend told Zarda's boss, who fired Zarda shortly thereafter. Zarda denied touching the student inappropriately and believed that he was fired solely because of his reference to his sexual orientation. The Court ruled, 10–3, that: "Logically, because sexual orientation is a function of sex and sex is a protected characteristic under Title VII, it follows that sexual orientation is also protected." Donald Zarda died in 2014 in a base jumping accident and the case was continued by his family. The ruling did not focus on whether the merits of his case specifically, but whether sexual orientation was protected as a function of sex, and in effect protected gay workers under the Civil Rights Act. Prior to the ruling, in July 2017, the Justice Department under President Trump had unexpectedly interceded in the case, arguing in filed a friend of the court brief that Title VII of the 1964 Civil Rights Act did not explicitly cover sexual orientation discrimination in the workplace. This stance put the DOJ at odds with the Equal Employment Opportunity Commission.

Gender identity

Glenn v. Brumby

In December 2011, the United States Court of Appeals for the Eleventh Circuit (covering Alabama, Florida and Georgia) ruled that Vandy Beth Glenn, a transgender woman living in Georgia, had been unfairly terminated from her job at the Georgia Legislative Assembly due to her transgender status. Relying on Price Waterhouse v. Hopkins and other Title VII precedent, the Court concluded that the plaintiff was discriminated against based on her sex because she was transitioning from male to female. The Court stated that a person is considered transgender "precisely because of the perception that his or her behavior transgresses gender stereotypes." As a result, there is "congruence" between discriminating against transgender individuals and discrimination on the basis of "gender-based behavioral norms." "Because everyone is protected against discrimination based on sex stereotypes, such protections cannot be denied to transgender individuals", the Court ruled.

EEOC v. R.G. & G.R. Harris Funeral Homes
On March 7, 2018, the United States Court of Appeals for the Sixth Circuit (covering Kentucky, Michigan, Ohio and Tennessee) ruled that Title VII of the Civil Rights Act of 1964 prohibits employment discrimination against transgender people. It also ruled that employers may not use the Religious Freedom Restoration Act to justify discrimination against LGBT people. Aimee Stephens, a transgender woman, began working for a funeral home and presented as male. In 2013, she told her boss that she had a gender identity disorder and planned to transition. She was promptly fired by her boss who said that "gender transition violat[es] God's commands because a person's sex is an immutable God-given fit."

Case law
Case law has been established in the following cases.

Schwenk v. Hartford
On February 29, 2000, citing Title VII case law, the United States Court of Appeals for the Ninth Circuit, which covers Alaska, Arizona, California, Idaho, Guam, Hawaii, Montana, Nevada, the Northern Mariana Islands, Oregon and Washington, ruled that a transgender woman serving a prison sentence appropriately stated a claim of sex discrimination under the Gender Motivated Violence Act when filing a complaint about an assault from a prison guard.

Rosa v. Parks W. Bank & Trust Co
On June 9, 2000, the United States Court of Appeals for the First Circuit (covering Maine, Massachusetts, New Hampshire, Puerto Rico and Rhode Island) ruled that Lucas Rosa, a transgender woman, could claim sex discrimination under the Equal Credit Opportunity Act when a bank denied her a loan application because of the way she was dressed. The ruling cited Title VII case law.

Tovar v. Essentia Health
On May 24, 2017, the United States Court of Appeals for the Eighth Circuit (covering Arkansas, Iowa, Minnesota, Missouri, Nebraska, North Dakota, and South Dakota) ruled in Tovar v. Essentia Health, the case of a nurse practitioner in Minnesota claiming discrimination based on gender identity because her insurance company would not cover her transgender child under her health insurance. The court ruled that Tovar lacked standing to pursue the claims of discrimination because she could not file suit on behalf of her child. However, in its ruling the 8th Circuit wrote that "because the district court concluded that Tovar is not within the class of plaintiffs for whom Title VII and the MHRA create causes of action, we assume for purposes of this appeal that the prohibition of sex-based discrimination under Title VII and the MHRA encompasses protection for transgender individuals".

Wittmer v. Phillips 66 Company
In April 2018, the U.S. District Court for the Southern District of Texas ruled that although a woman hadn't proven she had been discriminated against for being transgender by the company Phillips 66, if that had been proven, then the woman would have "had a case" under Title VII of the Civil Rights Act of 1964. The judge, who had been appointed by President George H. W. Bush in 1992, cited other recent cases as shaping the final decision.

States

Alabama

There is no legal prohibition of discrimination on the basis of sexual orientation and gender identity for both public and private employees on a statewide level.
 Sexual orientation and gender identity
Cities: Birmingham, Huntsville, Montevallo, and Tuscaloosa.
 Sexual orientation only
City: Montgomery.

Alaska

Statewide prohibition of discrimination on the basis of sexual orientation for state employees by executive order.
 Sexual orientation and gender identity
Consolidated city-boroughs: Anchorage, Juneau, and Sitka.

Arizona

Statewide prohibition of discrimination on the basis of both sexual orientation and gender identity for state employees and contractors by an executive order.
 Sexual orientation and gender identity
 Cities: Chandler, Flagstaff, Gilbert, Glendale, Mesa, Phoenix,  Scottsdale, Sedona, Tempe, Tucson, and Winslow.

Arkansas

There is no legal prohibition of discrimination on the basis of sexual orientation and gender identity for both public and private employees on a statewide level. The Arkansas Intrastate Commerce Improvement Act blocks any local unit of government from barring discrimination on any basis not already covered by state law to private businesses.
 Sexual orientation and gender identity
County: Pulaski.
Cities: Conway, Eureka Springs, Fayetteville, Hot Springs, Little Rock, and North Little Rock.
 Sexual orientation only
City: Marvell, and Springdale.

California

Statewide prohibition of discrimination on the basis of sexual orientation and gender identity for both public and private employees by state statute.

Colorado

Statewide prohibition of discrimination on the basis of sexual orientation and gender identity for both public and private employees by state statute.

Connecticut

Statewide prohibition of discrimination on the basis of sexual orientation and gender identity for both public and private employees by state statute.

Delaware

Statewide prohibition of discrimination on the basis of sexual orientation and gender identity for both public and private employees by state statute.

Florida

There is no legal prohibition of discrimination on the basis of sexual orientation and gender identity for both public and private employees on a statewide level. Florida cities banning discrimination on account of sexual orientation and gender identity in private employment which are located in counties with similar protections are not listed below. Such cities include Miami, Fort Lauderdale, Tampa, Tallahassee, etc.

 Sexual orientation and gender identity
Counties: Alachua, Broward, Hillsborough, Leon, Miami-Dade, Monroe, Orange, Osceola, Palm Beach, Pinellas, Sarasota, and Volusia.
Consolidated city-county: Jacksonville–Duval County.
Cities: Atlantic Beach, Cape Coral, Leesburg, Mascotte, Mount Dora, Neptune Beach, North Port, Port St. Lucie, Sarasota, St. Augustine Beach, and Venice.
 Sexual orientation only
Town: Montverde.

Georgia

There is no legal prohibition of discrimination on the basis of sexual orientation and gender identity for both public and private employees on a statewide level.
 Sexual orientation and gender identity
Counties: Gwinnett.
 Consolidated city-counties: Augusta-Richmond County, Athens-Clarke County,  and Macon-Bibb County.
Cities: Atlanta, Avondale Estates, Brookhaven, Chamblee, Clarkston, Decatur, Doraville, Dunwoody, Pine Lake, Savannah, Smyrna and Statesboro.
 Sexual orientation only
Counties: DeKalb, Fulton.
Cities: East Point, and Tybee Island.

Hawaii

Statewide prohibition of discrimination on the basis of sexual orientation and gender identity for both public and private employees by state statute.

Idaho

There is no legal prohibition of discrimination on the basis of sexual orientation and gender identity for both public and private employees on a statewide level.
 Sexual orientation and gender identity
County: Latah.
 Cities: Bellevue, Boise, Coeur d'Alene, Driggs, Hailey, Idaho Falls, Ketchum, Lewiston, Meridian, Moscow, Pocatello, Sandpoint, and Victor.
 Sexual orientation only
 City: Twin Falls.

Illinois

Statewide prohibition of discrimination on the basis of sexual orientation and gender identity for both public and private employees by state statute.

Indiana

Statewide prohibition of discrimination on the basis of sexual orientation and gender identity for state employees by executive order. Indiana cities banning discrimination on account of sexual orientation and gender identity in private employment which are located in counties with similar protections are not listed below. Such cities include Bloomington, Lafayette and Evansville.
 Sexual orientation and gender identity
Counties: Monroe, Tippecanoe, and Vanderburgh.
Consolidated city-county: Indianapolis-Marion County. 
Cities: Anderson, Carmel, Columbus, Crawfordsville, Hammond, Kokomo, Michigan City, Muncie, New Albany, South Bend, Terre Haute, Valparaiso, and West Lafayette.
Towns: Munster, and Zionsville.
 Sexual orientation only
County: Lake.
City: Fort Wayne.
Town: Whitestown.

Iowa

Statewide prohibition of discrimination on the basis of sexual orientation and gender identity for both public and private employees by state statute.

Kansas

Statewide prohibition of discrimination on the basis of sexual orientation and gender identity for state employees by executive order.
 Sexual orientation and gender identity
Consolidated city-county: Kansas City–Wyandotte County.
Cities: Fairway, Hutchinson, Lawrence, Leawood, Lenexa, Manhattan, Merriam, Mission, Mission Hills, Mission Woods, Olathe, Overland Park, Prairie Village, Roeland Park, Shawnee, Topeka, Westwood, and Westwood Hills.
 Sexual orientation only
City: Wichita.
County: Shawnee.

Kentucky

Statewide prohibition of discrimination on the basis of sexual orientation and gender identity for state employees by executive order.

Consolidated city-counties: Lexington-Fayette County, and Louisville-Jefferson County.
Counties: Woodford
Cities: Bellevue, Covington, Danville, Dayton, Fort Thomas, Frankfort, Georgetown, Highland Heights, Henderson, Maysville,  Morehead, Paducah, and Vicco.

Louisiana

There is no legal prohibition of discrimination on the basis of sexual orientation and gender identity for both public and private employees on a statewide level.
 Sexual orientation and gender identity
Parish: Jefferson. 
City and parish: New Orleans.
Cities: Alexandria, Baton Rouge, Lafayette, and Shreveport.
 Unincorporated community: Metairie.
 Sexual orientation only
City: Lake Charles.

Maine

Statewide prohibition of discrimination on the basis of sexual orientation and gender identity for both public and private employees by state statute.

Maryland

Statewide prohibition of discrimination on the basis of sexual orientation and gender identity for both public and private employees by state statute.

Massachusetts

Statewide prohibition of discrimination on the basis of sexual orientation and gender identity for both public and private employees by state statute.

Michigan

Statewide prohibition of discrimination on the basis of sexual orientation and gender identity for both public and private employees by state statute.

Minnesota

Statewide prohibition of discrimination on the basis of sexual orientation and gender identity for both public and private employees by state statute.

Mississippi

There is no legal prohibition of discrimination on the basis of sexual orientation and gender identity for both public and private employees on a statewide level.
 Sexual orientation and gender identity 
 Cities: Clarksdale, Hattiesburg, Holly Springs, Jackson, Magnolia, Oxford, and Starkville.

Missouri

Statewide prohibition of discrimination on the basis of sexual orientation for state employees by executive order.
 Sexual orientation and gender identity
Counties: Jackson, and St. Louis.
Independent city: St. Louis.
Cities: Clayton, Columbia, Creve Coeur, Ferguson, Kansas City, Kirksville, Kirkwood, Maplewood, Olivette, Richmond Heights, and St. Joseph, University City.
 Sexual orientation only
 City: St. Charles.

Montana

Statewide prohibition of discrimination on the basis of sexual orientation and gender identity for state employees by executive order.
 Sexual orientation and gender identity
County: Missoula.
City and county: Butte.
Cities: Bozeman, Helena, Missoula, and Whitefish.

Nebraska

There is no legal prohibition of discrimination on the basis of sexual orientation and gender identity for both public and private employees on a statewide level.
 Sexual orientation and gender identity
City: Bellevue, and Omaha.
 Sexual orientation only
Cities: Grand Island, and Lincoln.

Nevada

Statewide prohibition of discrimination on the basis of sexual orientation and gender identity for both public and private employees by state statute.

New Hampshire

Statewide prohibition of discrimination on the basis of sexual orientation and gender identity for both public and private employees by state statute.

New Jersey

Statewide prohibition of discrimination on the basis of sexual orientation and gender identity for both public and private employees by state statute.

New Mexico

Statewide prohibition of discrimination on the basis of sexual orientation and gender identity for both public and private employees by state statute.

New York

Statewide prohibition of discrimination on the basis of sexual orientation and gender identity for both public and private employees by state statute.

North Carolina

Statewide prohibition of discrimination on the basis of sexual orientation and gender identity for public employees only by executive order.

North Dakota

There is no legal prohibition of discrimination on the basis of sexual orientation and gender identity for both public and private employees on a statewide level.
 Sexual orientation and gender identity
City: Grand Forks.
 Sexual orientation only
Cities: Fargo, and Jamestown.

Ohio

Statewide prohibition of discrimination on the basis of both sexual orientation and gender identity or expression for state employees by executive order. Ohio cities banning discrimination on account of sexual orientation and gender identity in private employment which are located in counties with similar protections are not listed below. Such cities include Cleveland, Lakewood, and East Lansing, among others.
 Sexual orientation and gender identity
Counties: Cuyahoga, Franklin, Hamilton, Lucas, Montgomery, Summit, and Wood.
Cities: Akron, Athens, Bexley, Bowling Green, Canton, Cincinnati, Columbus, Coshocton, Dayton, Dublin, Gahanna, Hamilton, Kent, Lima, Medina, Newark, Oberlin, Olmsted Falls, Oxford, Sandusky, South Euclid, Springfield, Toledo, Westerville, Worthington, and Youngstown.
Villages: Laura, and Yellow Springs.

Oklahoma

There is no legal prohibition of discrimination on the basis of sexual orientation and gender identity for both public and private employees on a statewide level.
 Sexual orientation and gender identity
City: Norman.
 Sexual orientation only
Cities: Edmond, Oklahoma City, and Tulsa.

Oregon

Statewide prohibition of discrimination on the basis of sexual orientation and gender identity for both public and private employees by state statute.

Pennsylvania

Statewide prohibition of discrimination on the basis of sexual orientation and gender identity for state employees by executive order. While the state has not explicitly enacted anti-discrimination legislation, discrimination in employment based on both sexual orientation and gender identity is interpreted by the Pennsylvania Human Relations Commission as being banned under the category of sex of the Pennsylvania Human Relations Act. Pennsylvania cities banning discrimination on account of sexual orientation and gender identity in private employment which are located in counties with similar protections are not listed below. Such cities include Pittsburgh, Mt. Lebanon, and Ross Township, among others.
 Sexual orientation and gender identity
Counties: Allegheny, and Erie.
Consolidated city-county: Philadelphia.
Cities: Allentown, Bethlehem, Easton, Harrisburg, Lancaster, Pittston, Reading, Scranton, Wilkes-Barre, and York.
Townships: Abington, Cheltenham, East Norriton, Haverford, Lower Merion, Newtown, Springfield, Susquehanna, Upper Dublin, Upper Merion, Upper Moreland, West Norrition, and Whitemarsh.
Boroughs: Ambler, Bridgeport, Bristol, Camp Hill, Carlisle, Conshohocken, Dickson City, Downingtown, Doylestown, Hatboro, Huntingdon,  Jenkintown, Kennett Square, Lansdale, Lansdowne, Narberth, New Hope, Newtown, Norristown, North Wales, Phoenixville, Plymouth, Royersford, State College, Stroudsburg, Swarthmore, West Chester, West Conshohocken, and Yardley.
 Sexual orientation only
Borough: Oxford.

Rhode Island

Statewide prohibition of discrimination on the basis of sexual orientation and gender identity for both public and private employees by state statute.

South Carolina

There is no legal prohibition of discrimination on the basis of sexual orientation and gender identity for both public and private employees on a statewide level.
 Sexual orientation and gender identity
County: Richland.
Cities: Charleston, Columbia, and Myrtle Beach.
Towns: Latta, and Mount Pleasant.
 Sexual orientation only
Cities: Folly Beach, and North Charleston.

South Dakota

There is no legal prohibition of discrimination on the basis of sexual orientation and gender identity for both public and private employees on a statewide level.
 Sexual orientation and gender identity
County: Oglala Lakota.
Cities: Brookings, Sioux Falls, and Vermillion.
 Sexual orientation only
County: Minnehaha.
Cities: Spearfish, and Watertown.

Tennessee

There is no legal prohibition of discrimination on the basis of sexual orientation and gender identity for both public and private employees on a statewide level. The Tennessee Equal Access to Intrastate Commerce Act blocks any local unit of government from barring discrimination on any basis not already covered by state law to private businesses.

 Sexual orientation and gender identity
County: Davidson.
Cities: Chattanooga, Knoxville, Memphis, and Nashville.
 Sexual orientation only
City: Franklin.

Texas

There is no legal prohibition of discrimination on the basis of sexual orientation and gender identity for both public and private employees on a statewide level. Texas cities banning discrimination on account of sexual orientation gender identity in private employment which are located in counties with similar protections are not listed below. This include the city of Dallas.

 Sexual orientation and gender identity
Counties: Bexar, Dallas, and Walker.
Cities: Austin, Arlington, Brownsville, Corpus Christi, Denton, El Paso, Fort Worth, Lubbock, Mesquite,  Plano, San Antonio, and Waco.
Note that Arlington, Brownsville, Corpus Christi, Denton, Lubbock, Mesquite, and Waco  have protections for sexual orientation and gender identity offered only for city employment, which may include city contractors.

 Sexual orientation only
Cities: Grand Prairie, and McAllen, and Round Rock.

Utah

Statewide prohibition of discrimination on the basis of sexual orientation and gender identity for both public and private employees by state statute.

Vermont

Statewide prohibition of discrimination on the basis of sexual orientation and gender identity for both public and private employees by state statute.

Virginia

Statewide prohibition of discrimination on the basis of sexual orientation and gender identity for both public and private employees by state statute. An additional law within Virginia, also allows cities and counties to make their own ordinances on this topic as well listed below.
 Sexual orientation and gender identity
Independent cities: Charlottesville, and Richmond.
 Sexual orientation only
County: Arlington.
Independent city: Alexandria.

Washington

Statewide prohibition of discrimination on the basis of sexual orientation and gender identity for both public and private employees by state statute.

West Virginia

 Sexual orientation and gender identity
Cities: Beckley, Buckhannon, Charles Town, Charleston, Fairmont, Huntington, Lewisburg, Martinsburg, Morgantown, and Wheeling.
Towns: Harpers Ferry, Shepherdstown, Sutton, and Thurmond.
 Sexual orientation only
County: Kanawha.
City: Elkins.

Wisconsin

Statewide prohibition of discrimination on the basis of sexual orientation for both public and private employees by state statute. Statewide prohibition of discrimination on the basis of gender identity for state employees by executive order. Wisconsin cities banning discrimination on account of gender identity in private employment which are located in counties with similar protections are not listed below. Such cities include Milwaukee, Madison and Cudahy.
 Sexual orientation and gender identity
Counties: Dane, and Milwaukee.
Cities: Appleton, De Pere, Janesville, Oshkosh, Racine, and Stevens Point.

Wyoming

There is no legal prohibition of discrimination on the basis of sexual orientation and gender identity for both public and private employees on a statewide level.
 Sexual orientation and gender identity
Cities: Jackson, and Laramie.
 Sexual orientation only
City: Casper, Cheyenne, and Gillette.

District of Columbia

Prohibition of discrimination on the basis of sexual orientation and gender identity for both public and private employees by statute.

Territories

American Samoa

There is no legal prohibition of discrimination on the basis of sexual orientation and gender identity for both public and private employees on a statewide level.

Guam

Prohibition of discrimination on the basis of sexual orientation and gender identity for both public and private employees by statute.

Northern Mariana Islands

Statewide prohibition of discrimination on the basis of sexual orientation for state employees by state statute.

Puerto Rico

Prohibition of discrimination on the basis of sexual orientation and gender identity for both public and private employees by statute.

United States Virgin Islands

Prohibition of discrimination on the basis of sexual orientation and gender identity for both public and private employees by statute.

Notes

References

LGBT law in the United States
LGBT rights in the United States
History of LGBT civil rights in the United States
Anti-discrimination law in the United States
United States labor law
Employment discrimination
LGBT-related lists